New York's 97th State Assembly district is one of the 150 districts in the New York State Assembly. It has been represented by Republican John McGowan since 2023, succeeding Mike Lawler.

Geography
District 97 is located in southern Rockland County, comprising portions of Ramapo and Orangetown.

Recent election results

2022

2020

2018

2016

2014

2012

References 

97
Rockland County, New York